Victor II, Duke of Ratibor, Prince of Corvey, Prince of Hohenlohe-Schillingsfürst  (6 September 18479 August 1923) was a member of the House of Hohenlohe-Schillingsfürst and Duke of the Silesian duchy of Ratibor.

Early life and family
Victor was born at Schloss Rauden, Kingdom of Prussia, eldest son of Victor I, Duke of Ratibor (1818–1893), (son of Franz Joseph, Prince of Hohenlohe-Schillingsfürst and Princess Constanze of Hohenlohe-Langenburg) and his wife, Princess Amélie of Fürstenberg (1821–1899), (daughter of Karl Egon II, Prince of Fürstenberg and Princess Amalie of Baden). 

He studied Law in Bonn and Göttingen and was a member of the Corps Borussia (1867) and Corps Saxonia (1890). In Saxonia were also his four brothers, Max, Karl Egon, Franz (Colonel à la suite) and Egon (Lord Chamberlain).

Military career
After making his Doctorate in Law he entered the Potsdamer Life Guards Hussar Regiment in which he fought during the Franco-Prussian War.

Political career
Between 1873 and 1876 he worked at the German Embassy in Vienna. In 1893 he took over the dominions Kieferstädtel and Zembowitz in Upper Silesia. 

From 1897 to 1921 he was Chairman of the Silesia Province respectively of the Upper Silesian provincial parliament. As a member of the Free Conservative Party, he ran in 1885 and 1888 for the Prussian House of Representatives. Since 1893, he was a member of the Prussian House of Lords. From 1896 to 1904 he was chairman of the New Coalition Party.

Marriage

Victor married 19 June 1877 at Vienna to Countess Maria Breunner-Enkevoirth (1856–1929), daughter of Count August Breunner-Enkevoirth, and his wife, Countess Agatha Széchényi de Sárvár-Felsövidék. 

They had four children:
Victor III, Duke of Ratibor (2 February 1879 – 11 November 1945), married in 1910 to Princess Elisabeth of Oettingen-Oettingen and Oettingen-Spielberg, had issue.
Prince Hans of Hohenlohe-Schillingsfürst (8 March 1882 – 5 January 1948), married in 1918 to Princess Marie of Windisch-Graetz, no issue.
Princess Agatha of Hohenlohe-Schillingsfürst (24 July 1888 – 12 December 1960), married in 1910 to Prince Friedrich Wilhelm of Prussia, had issue.
Princess Margaret of Hohenlohe-Schillingsfürst (3 Mar 1894–1973)

Honours, awards and arms

Military appointments
 Major general à la suite of the Prussian Army
 Honorary Citizen of Breslau, 1913

Orders and decorations

Arms

Ancestry

Notes and sources
Genealogisches Handbuch des Adels, Fürstliche Häuser, Reference: 1956

References

|-

|-

|-

|-

|-

1847 births
1923 deaths
People from Racibórz County
House of Hohenlohe
Major generals of Prussia
German landowners
Members of the Prussian House of Lords
Recipients of the Iron Cross (1870), 2nd class
Commanders Grand Cross of the Order of the Polar Star
Commanders of the Order of Franz Joseph
Knights of Malta